Hungerford is a historic market town and civil parish in Berkshire, England,  west of Newbury,  east of Marlborough,  northeast of Salisbury and 60 miles (97 km) west of London. The Kennet and Avon Canal passes through the town alongside the River Dun, a major tributary of the River Kennet. The confluence with the Kennet is to the north of the centre whence canal and river both continue east. Amenities include schools, shops, cafés, restaurants, and facilities for the main national sports.  railway station is a minor stop on the Reading to Taunton Line.

History 

Hungerford is derived from an Anglo-Saxon name meaning "ford leading to poor land". The town's symbol is the estoile and crescent moon. The place does not occur in the Domesday Book of 1086 but by 1241, it called itself a borough. In the late 14th century, John of Gaunt was lord of the manor and he granted the people the lucrative fishing rights on the River Kennet. The family of Walter Hungerford, 1st Baron Hungerford originated in the town (c. 1450), although after three generations the title passed to Baroness Hungerford who married Sir Edward Hastings who became a Baron, and the family seat moved to Heytesbury, Wiltshire.

During the English Civil War, the Earl of Essex and his army spent the night here in June 1644. In October of the same year, the Earl of Manchester’s cavalry were quartered in the town. Then, in the November, Charles I’s forces arrived in Hungerford on their way to Abingdon. During the Glorious Revolution of 1688, William of Orange was offered the Crown of England while staying at the Bear Inn in Hungerford. The Hungerford land south of the river Kennet was for centuries, until a widespread growth in cultivation in the area in the 18th century, in Savernake Forest.

1987 Massacre

The Hungerford massacre occurred on 19 August 1987. A 27-year-old unemployed local labourer, Michael Robert Ryan, armed with several weapons including a Type 56 assault rifle and a Beretta pistol, shot and killed 16 people in and around the town – including his mother – and wounded 15 others, then killed himself in a local school after being surrounded by armed police. All his victims were shot in the town or in nearby Savernake Forest.

A report on the massacre was commissioned by Home Secretary Douglas Hurd from the Chief Constable of Thames Valley Police, Colin Smith. It is one of three highly costly firearms atrocities in terms of lives in the United Kingdom since the invention of such rapid fire weapons, the other two being the Dunblane massacre and Cumbria shootings. The massacre led to the Firearms (Amendment) Act 1988, which banned the ownership of semi-automatic centre-fire rifles and restricted the use of shotguns with a magazine capacity of more than two rounds. The Hungerford Report had demonstrated that Ryan's collection of weapons was legally licensed.

Government 
Hungerford is a civil parish, covering the town of Hungerford and a surrounding rural area, including the small village of Hungerford Newtown. The parish was divided into four tithings: Hungerford or Town, Sanden Fee, Eddington with Hidden and Newtown and Charnham Street. North and South Standen and Charnham Street were officially detached parts of Wiltshire until transferred to Berkshire in 1895. Leverton and Calcot were transferred to Hungerford parish from Chilton Foliat in Wiltshire in 1895. The parish shares boundaries with the Berkshire parishes of Lambourn, East Garston, Great Shefford, Kintbury and Inkpen, and with the Wiltshire parishes of Shalbourne, Froxfield, Ramsbury and Chilton Foliat. Parish council responsibilities are undertaken by Hungerford Town Council, which consists of fifteen volunteer councillors and committee members, supported by a full-time clerk. The mayor is elected from amongst their numbers. 

The parish forms part of the district administered by the unitary authority of West Berkshire, and local government responsibilities are shared between the town council and unitary authority. Hungerford is part of the Newbury parliamentary constituency. Hungerford participates in town twinning to foster good international relations:
 Ligueil, Indre-et-Loire, France.

Geography 
Hungerford is on the River Dun. It is the westernmost town in Berkshire, on the border with Wiltshire. It is in the North Wessex Downs. The highest point in the entire South East England region is the  summit of Walbury Hill,  from the town centre. The Kennet and Avon Canal separates Hungerford from what might be described as the town's only suburb, the hamlet of Eddington. It is almost equidistant from the towns of Newbury and Marlborough. Freeman's Marsh, on the western edge of the town, is a Site of Special Scientific Interest.

Transport 

Many residents commute to nearby towns such as Newbury, Swindon, Marlborough, Thatcham and Reading.

Church

The parish church of St. Lawrence stands next to the Kennet and Avon Canal. It was rebuilt in 1814–1816 by John Pinch the elder in the Gothic Revival style. The east window contains stained glass by Lavers and Westlake. The church is a Grade II* listed building.

Sport and leisure 
Hungerford has a cricket team, a football team, Hungerford Town F.C., that plays at the Bulpit Lane ground, a rugby team, Hungerford RFC. and a netball club. Hungerford Archers, an archery club, uses the sports field of the John O'Gaunt School as its shooting ground. Hungerford Hares Running Club was established in 2007.

Hocktide 
Hungerford is the only place in the country to have continuously celebrated Hocktide or Tutti Day (the second Tuesday after Easter). Today it marks the end of the town council's financial and administrative year, but in the past it was a more general celebration associated with the town's great patron, John of Gaunt. Its origins are thought to lie in celebrations following King Alfred's expulsion of the Vikings. The "Bellman" (or town crier) summons the Commoners of the town to the Hocktide Court held at Hungerford Town Hall, while two florally decorated "Tutti Men" and the "Orange Man" visit every house with commoners' rights (almost a hundred properties), accompanied by six Tutti Girls, drawn from the local school. Originally they collected "head pennies" to ensure fishing and grazing rights. Today, they largely collect kisses from each lady of the house. In the court, the town's officers are elected for the coming year and the accounts examined. The court manages the town hall, the John of Gaunt Inn, the Common, Freeman's Marsh, and fishing rights in the River Kennet and river Dun.

Legends 
There is an old legend that "Hingwar the Dane", better known as Ivarr the Boneless, was drowned accidentally while crossing the Kennet here, and that the town was named after him. This stems from the, probably mistaken, belief that the Battle of Ethandun took place at Eddington in Berkshire rather than Edington, Wiltshire, or Edington, Somerset.

Literature
Hungerford is one of two places which arguably meet the criteria for Kennetbridge in Thomas Hardy's novel Jude the Obscure, being "a thriving town not more than a dozen miles south of Marygreen" (Fawley) and is between Melchester (Salisbury) and Christminster (Oxford). The main road (A338) from Oxford to Salisbury runs through Hungerford. The other contender is the larger town of Newbury.

Notable people
 Charlie Austin, footballer
 Adam Brown, actor, comedian and pantomime performer 
 Samuel Chandler, Nonconformist theologian and preacher
 Christopher Derrick, author
 Edward Duke (1779–1852), antiquary
 Ralph Evans (1915–1996), footballer
 John of Gaunt, 1st Duke of Lancaster, son of King Edward III
 William Greatrakes, connected with the authorship of the Letters of Junius
 Nicholas Monro (b. 1936), artist, had a studio at Hungerford
 George Pocock (1774–1843), the founder of the Tent Methodist Society and inventor of the Charvolant
 Charles Portal, 1st Viscount Portal of Hungerford, Chief of the Air Staff during most of World War II and Marshal of the Royal Air Force
 Reginald Portal, admiral
 Henry "Harry" Quelch (1858–1913), one of the first British Marxists
 Edmund Roche, 5th Baron Fermoy, maternal uncle of Diana, Princess of Wales, died in Hungerford in 1984
 Robert Snooks, last highwayman to be hanged in England, born in Hungerford in 1761
 James E. Talmage, (1862–1933) LDS Church leader, writer and theologian. Author of Jesus the Christ
 Jethro Tull (agriculturist), died in the town
 Will Young, singer

Demography

Freedom of the Town
The following people and military units have received the Freedom of the Town of Hungerford.

Individuals
 Jennifer Bartter: 3 September 2022.
 Martin Crane : 3 September 2022.
 Penny Locke: 3 September 2022.

See also 
 List of places in Berkshire
 List of civil parishes in England
 List of towns in England

References

External links 
Hungerford Virtual Museum
Hungerford Town Council
Hungerford Historical Association
Royal Berkshire History: Hungerford
Photos of Hungerford and surrounding area on geograph

 
Towns in Berkshire
Market towns in Berkshire
Civil parishes in Berkshire
West Berkshire District
Kennet and Avon Canal